The governor-general of Fiji was the representative of the Fijian monarch in the Dominion of Fiji from the country's independence in 1970 until the monarchy's deposition in 1987.

History

Fiji became a sovereign state and an independent monarchy in the Commonwealth of Nations on 10 October 1970. Queen Elizabeth II became Fiji's monarch, and held the title of queen of Fiji until 1987, when the monarchy was deposed following two military coups, led by Lieutenant Colonel Sitiveni Rabuka.

The monarch's functions were exercised in Fiji by her representative, the governor-general of Fiji.

In 1987, following the monarchy's overthrow, the position of governor-general was abolished. The Fijian monarch was replaced with a president as head of state.

List of governors-general of Fiji
Following is a list of people who have served as governor-general of Fiji.

See also
Governor of Fiji
List of heads of state of Fiji
Monarchy of Fiji
President of Fiji

 
Colony of Fiji people
Heads of state of Fiji
Fiji
Colony of Fiji
Politics of Fiji
Fiji and the Commonwealth of Nations